Portrait of Pier Maria Rossi di San Secondo is a painting by the Italian Mannerist artist Parmigianino, executed around 1535–1539 and housed in the Museo del Prado, Madrid, Spain. The subject was Count of San Secondo, and the painting forms a pair with a group portrait of his Countess and their children, Portrait of Camilla Gonzaga and Her Three Sons, although the latter is not unanimously attributed to Parmigianino.

History
It is mentioned in a 1686 inventory of the collections of the Royal Alcazar of Madrid, as the portrait of count of San Sigundo. The subject has been identified with Pier Maria III de' Rossi basing on this note, and by another from 1630 by one of his descendants  about the existence of a portrait of him by Parmigianino.

The painting arrived in Spain in 1664, after King Philip IV had supported the Rossi family in a dispute with the Farnese of Parma about some territories.  It has been dated from around 1535 to 1539, based on the age of Pier Maria (born in 1508) in the portrait, and a statement by Parmigianino's contemporary, the art historian Giorgio Vasari, that the artist took refuge at Pier Maria's court in the period in question.

Description
The count  is portrayed standing in front of  a precious damask cloth background. He wears a long and wide, fur-lined black jacket, a waistcoat in the same color, a white shirt and white trousers with contemporary "French" cuts and padded codpiece. His austere posture and the hand at the sword's hilt refer to Pier Maria's military career. He looks to the right, ideally towards his wife's portrait.

At the right is a landscape with a city rich of monuments, perhaps Rome. The objects are also references to the count's life and personal interests: a statue of Mars, the Roman war god, an ancient bas-relief (symbol of his collector attitude), and some books, hinting to his love for literature (he was in  correspondence  of poet Pietro Aretino). One of the books has the inscription "Imperio", referring to Pier Maria's commitment  with emperor Charles V at the time in which the work was painted.

See also
Portrait of Camilla Gonzaga and Her Three Sons

Sources

External links
Page at the museum's website 

Rossi di San Secondo
San Secondo
1530s paintings
Paintings of the Museo del Prado by Italian artists